He Guangbei, JP, is vice chairman and chief executive officer of BOC Hong Kong Holdings, Bank of China and BOC Group Life Assurance.
He is also the chairman of Chiyu Banking Corporation and director of Nanyang Commercial Bank.

Education 
 1975–1979—Beijing Second Foreign Languages Institute, bachelor's degree
 1983–1985—University of Texas at Dallas, master's degree in international management studies

Other appointments 
 In corporates
 Designated Representative of Bank of China (Hong Kong) for the Hong Kong Association of Banks
 Director of Hong Kong Note Printing Limited
 Director of Hong Kong Interbank Clearing Limited

 In government bodies
 Member of the board of Airport Authority Hong Kong
 Member of the Hong Kong Monetary Authority Exchange Fund Advisory Committee and Banking Advisory Committee
 Member of the Hong Kong Economic Development Commission

 In associations
 President of the Hong Kong Chinese Enterprises Association
 Director of the China Association of Government Bonds, mainland China
 General Committee Member of the Hong Kong General Chamber of Commerce
 Member of the China National Committee for the Pacific Economic Cooperation, mainland China

References

Chinese bankers
Beijing International Studies University people
University of Texas at Dallas alumni
1954 births
Living people
Businesspeople from Beijing